State Road 453 (NM 453) is a  state highway in the US state of New Mexico. NM 453's southern terminus is at U.S. Route 56 (US 56) and US 412 west of Clayton, and the northern terminus is at US 64 and US 87 in Grenville.

Major intersections

See also

References

453
Transportation in Union County, New Mexico